Maradiaga is a surname. Notable people with the surname include:

Jorge Maradiaga (born 1972), Honduran decathlete
Ramón Maradiaga (born 1954), Honduran footballer and manager
Félix Maradiaga (born 1976), Nicaraguan politician

See also
Javier Hernández Maradiaga (born 1988), Honduran swimmer
Óscar Rodríguez Maradiaga (born 1942), Honduran Roman Catholic archbishop